The 2020–21 Golden State Warriors season was the 75th season of the franchise in the National Basketball Association (NBA), its 59th in the San Francisco Bay Area, and their second season playing home games at Chase Center. They were coached by Steve Kerr, in his seventh year as head coach.

This season Stephen Curry became the franchise's all-time scoring leader when he broke Wilt Chamberlain's record of 17,783 points that stood for 57 years. Curry moved into second on the all-time career three-point scoring list with 2,832, 141 behind the record holder Ray Allen. Curry was the league Scoring Champion for the second time in his career, averaging 32 points per game. Curry was named to the All-NBA First Team, his seventh selection to an All-NBA Team, a Warriors franchise record. Draymond Green was named to the All-Defensive First Team for the fourth time in his career, and sixth All-NBA Team overall.

After a one year absence from postseason, the Warriors qualified for the first stage of the new Play-in Tournament as the No. 8 seed.  As such, the Warriors had the double chance to advance.  However, in the seventh seed game, they lost to the Los Angeles Lakers, 100-103, dropping to the elimination round of the play-in against Memphis Grizzlies, which they lost, 112-117.

Previous season 

The Warriors finished the 2019–20 season 15–50 to finish in last place in the Western Conference having the worst record in the Conference.

Preseason 
The Warriors entered the season with a chance to come back into championship contention after missing the playoffs for the first time since 2012. With the COVID-19 pandemic forcing the 2019–20 NBA season to be temporarily suspended, the Warriors had not played a game since March 2020.

On November 17, 2020, the NBA announced the 2020–21 season would begin on December 22, 2020.

The Warriors started the season with a healthy Stephen Curry, as he previously injured his second metacarpal bone in his left finger against the Phoenix Suns at Chase Center on October 30, 2019, causing him to miss 60 of the 65 games available and playing in 5 of those respective games. The Warriors also expect to have a healthy Kevon Looney, who was struggling with neuropathy for most of the season, as he only played 20 games. Klay Thompson was also expected to be healthy this season, but on November 19, 2020, it was announced that he would miss the entire season due to injuring his right Achilles tendon. Thompson hasn't played in an NBA game since Game 6 of the 2019 NBA Finals. After sitting out for two consecutive seasons, he would finally make his return on January 9, 2022 against the Cleveland Cavaliers, where he recorded 17 points and 3 rebounds in a 96–82 win.

As a result of being the worst team in the league, the Warriors were in the NBA draft lottery and they received the second overall selection. With that selection, the Warriors drafted Memphis center James Wiseman. They also selected point guard Nico Mannion with the 48th pick and shooting guard Justinian Jessup with the 51st pick.

Draft

Before the start of the 2020 NBA draft period, the Warriors' selection was held stuck as the #1 selection of the draft with their record being the worst of all NBA teams the prior season at 15–50 before the NBA suspended their season on March 12, 2020 and cancelled the rest of Golden State's season by June 5. As a result, they held the best odds to stay at #1 alongside the Minnesota Timberwolves and Cleveland Cavaliers for the 2020 draft, though also holding the highest odds to fall as low as the #5 pick with 47.9% odds of dropping there. The Warriors ended the 2020 NBA draft lottery with the #2 selection, dropping down one spot with the Timberwolves moving up to the #1 position. In addition to their first-round pick, the Warriors also gained two second-round picks from previous trades involving the Dallas Mavericks.

Standings

Division

Conference

Notes
 z – Clinched home court advantage for the entire playoffs
 y – Clinched division title
 x – Clinched playoff spot
 * – Division leader

Roster

Roster Notes
 Klay Thompson missed the entire season with a torn right Achilles tendon.

Game log

Preseason

|- style="background:#cfc"
| 1
| December 12
| Denver
| 
| Kent Bazemore (13)
| Eric Paschall (7)
| 4 tied (3)
| Chase Center0
| 1–0
|- style="background:#fcc"
| 2
| December 15
| @ Sacramento
| 
| Stephen Curry (29)
| Marquese Chriss (9)
| 4 tied (4)
| Golden 1 Center0
| 1–1
|- style="background:#cfc"
| 3
| December 17
| @ Sacramento
| 
| Stephen Curry (29)
| Marquese Chriss (12)
| Curry, Looney, Wiggins (3)
| Golden 1 Center0
| 2–1

Regular season
The schedule for the first two games of the season was released on December 2, 2020, while the schedule for the first half of the season was released on December 4. The schedule for the second half of the season was released on February 24, 2021.

|- style="background:#fcc"
| 1
| December 22
| @ Brooklyn
| 
| Stephen Curry (20)
| Marquese Chriss (8)
| Stephen Curry (10)
| Barclays Center0
| 0–1
|- style="background:#fcc"
| 2
| December 25
| @ Milwaukee
| 
| Stephen Curry (19)
| James Wiseman (8)
| Stephen Curry (6)
| Fiserv Forum0
| 0–2
|- style="background:#cfc"
| 3
| December 27
| @ Chicago
| 
| Stephen Curry (36)
| Kelly Oubre Jr. (11)
| Stephen Curry (6)
| United Center0
| 1–2
|- style="background:#cfc"
| 4
| December 29
| @ Detroit
| 
| Stephen Curry (31)
| Andrew Wiggins (7)
| Stephen Curry (6)
| Little Caesars Arena0
| 2–2

|- style="background:#fcc"
| 5
| January 1
| Portland
| 
| Stephen Curry (26)
| Stephen Curry (8)
| Stephen Curry (5)
| Chase Center0
| 2–3
|- style="background:#cfc"
| 6
| January 3
| Portland
| 
| Stephen Curry (62)
| James Wiseman (11)
| Draymond Green (8)
| Chase Center0
| 3–3
|- style="background:#cfc"
| 7
| January 4
| Sacramento
| 
| Stephen Curry (30)
| Stephen Curry (9)
| Stephen Curry (8)
| Chase Center0
| 4–3
|- style="background:#fcc"
| 8
| January 6
| L. A. Clippers
| 
| Paschall, Wiggins (19)
| Draymond Green (6)
| Draymond Green (6)
| Chase Center0
| 4–4
|- style="background:#cfc"
| 9
| January 8
| L. A. Clippers
| 
| Stephen Curry (38)
| 4 tied (6)
| Stephen Curry (11)
| Chase Center0
| 5–4
|- style="background:#cfc"
| 10
| January 10
| Toronto
| 
| Andrew Wiggins (17)
| Curry, Green (9)
| Draymond Green (10)
| Chase Center0
| 6–4
|- style="background:#fcc"
| 11
| January 12
| Indiana
| 
| Andrew Wiggins (22)
| Looney, Wiseman (9)
| Draymond Green (10)
| Chase Center0
| 6–5
|- style="background:#fcc"
| 12
| January 14
| @ Denver
| 
| Stephen Curry (35)
| Stephen Curry (11)
| Draymond Green (7)
| Ball Arena0
| 6–6
|- style="background:#bbb"
| —
| January 15
| @ Phoenix
| colspan="6" | Postponed (COVID-19) (Makeup date: March 4)
|- style="background:#cfc"
| 13
| January 18
| @ L. A. Lakers
| 
| Stephen Curry (26)
| Draymond Green (8)
| Draymond Green (9)
| Staples Center0
| 7–6
|- style="background:#cfc"
| 14
| January 20
| San Antonio
| 
| Stephen Curry (26)
| Stephen Curry (11)
| Stephen Curry (7)
| Chase Center0
| 8–6
|- style="background:#fcc"
| 15
| January 21
| New York
| 
| Stephen Curry (30)
| Andrew Wiggins (9)
| Draymond Green (8)
| Chase Center0
| 8–7
|- style="background:#fcc"
| 16
| January 23
| @ Utah
| 
| Stephen Curry (24)
| Stephen Curry (7)
| Stephen Curry (7)
| Vivint Arena1,932
| 8–8
|- style="background:#cfc"
| 17
| January 25
| Minnesota
| 
| Stephen Curry (36)
| Green, Oubre Jr., Wiggins (6)
| Green, Looney, Oubre Jr. (4)
| Chase Center0
| 9–8
|- style="background:#cfc"
| 18
| January 27
| Minnesota
| 
| James Wiseman (25)
| Kevon Looney (10)
| Curry, Green (8)
| Chase Center0
| 10–8
|- style="background:#fcc"
| 19
| January 28
| @ Phoenix
| 
| Stephen Curry (27)
| Lee, Wiseman (6)
| Draymond Green (6)
| Phoenix Suns Arena0
| 10–9
|- style="background:#cfc"
| 20
| January 30
| Detroit
| 
| Stephen Curry (28)
| James Wiseman (9)
| Curry, Wanamaker (7)
| Chase Center0
| 11–9

|- style="background:#fcc"
| 21
| February 2
| Boston
| 
| Stephen Curry (38)
| Curry, Green (11)
| Stephen Curry (8)
| Chase Center0
| 11–10
|- style="background:#cfc"
| 22
| February 4
| @ Dallas
| 
| Kelly Oubre Jr. (40)
| Oubre Jr., Toscano-Anderson (8)
| Draymond Green (15)
| American Airlines Center0
| 12–10
|- style="background:#fcc"
| 23
| February 6
| @ Dallas
| 
| Stephen Curry (57)
| Juan Toscano-Anderson (10)
| Draymond Green (15)
| American Airlines Center0
| 12–11
|- style="background:#fcc"
| 24
| February 8
| @ San Antonio
| 
| Stephen Curry (32)
| Juan Toscano-Anderson (11)
| Draymond Green (10)
| AT&T Center0
| 12–12
|- style="background:#cfc"
| 25
| February 9
| @ San Antonio
| 
| Stephen Curry (32)
| Kelly Oubre Jr. (10)
| Draymond Green (11)
| AT&T Center0
| 13–12
|- style="background:#cfc"
| 26
| February 11
| Orlando
| 
| Stephen Curry (40)
| Kelly Oubre Jr. (10)
| Draymond Green (11)
| Chase Center0
| 14–12
|- style="background:#fcc"
| 27
| February 13
| Brooklyn
| 
| Stephen Curry (27)
| Kelly Oubre Jr. (10)
| Draymond Green (8)
| Chase Center0
| 14–13
|- style="background:#cfc"
| 28
| February 15
| Cleveland
| 
| Stephen Curry (36)
| Green, Paschall (8)
| Draymond Green (16)
| Chase Center0
| 15–13
|- style="background:#cfc"
| 29
| February 17
| Miami
| 
| Kent Bazemore (26)
| Bazemore, Oubre Jr., Wiggins (8)
| Stephen Curry (11)
| Chase Center0
| 16–13
|- style="background:#fcc"
| 30
| February 19
| @ Orlando
| 
| Stephen Curry (29)
| Curry, Oubre Jr. (7)
| Stephen Curry (11)
| Amway Center4,287
| 16–14
|- style="background:#fcc"
| 31
| February 20
| @ Charlotte
| 
| Kelly Oubre Jr. (25)
| Draymond Green (7)
| Brad Wanamaker (5)
| Spectrum Center0
| 16–15
|- style="background:#cfc"
| 32
| February 23
| @ New York
| 
| Stephen Curry (37)
| Draymond Green (9)
| Draymond Green (12)
| Madison Square Garden1,981
| 17–15
|- style="background:#cfc"
| 33
| February 24
| @ Indiana
| 
| Stephen Curry (24)
| Draymond Green (9)
| Draymond Green (11)
| Bankers Life Fieldhouse0
| 18–15
|- style="background:#cfc"
| 34
| February 26
| Charlotte
| 
| Stephen Curry (29)
| Draymond Green (12)
| Draymond Green (19)
| Chase Center0
| 19–15
|- style="background:#fcc"
| 35
| February 28
| @ L. A. Lakers
| 
| Eric Paschall (18)
| James Wiseman (8)
| Stephen Curry (7)
| Staples Center0
| 19–16

|- style="background:#fcc"
| 36
| March 3
| @ Portland
| 
| Stephen Curry (35)
| Draymond Green (9)
| Draymond Green (12)
| Moda Center0
| 19–17
|- style="background:#fcc"
| 37
| March 4
| @ Phoenix
| 
| Jordan Poole (26)
| James Wiseman (11)
| Nico Mannion (6)
| Phoenix Suns Arena3,233
| 19–18
|- style="background:#fcc"
| 38
| March 11
| @ L. A. Clippers
| 
| Oubre Jr., Wiggins (15)
| Andrew Wiggins (8)
| Jordan Poole (4)
| Staples Center0
| 19–19
|- style="background:#cfc"
| 39
| March 14
| Utah
| 
| Stephen Curry (32)
| Draymond Green (12)
| Draymond Green (12)
| Chase Center0
| 20–19
|- style="background:#fcc"
| 40
| March 15
| L. A. Lakers
| 
| Stephen Curry (27)
| James Wiseman (8)
| Draymond Green (7)
| Chase Center0
| 20–20
|- style="background:#cfc"
| 41
| March 17
| @ Houston
| 
| Jordan Poole (23)
| Draymond Green (12)
| Draymond Green (10)
| Toyota Center3,259
| 21–20
|- style="background:#cfc"
| 42
| March 19
| @ Memphis
| 
| Andrew Wiggins (40)
| Draymond Green (11)
| Draymond Green (13)
| FedExForum2,716
| 22–20
|- style="background:#fcc"
| 43
| March 20
| @ Memphis
| 
| Jordan Poole (26)
| Andrew Wiggins (9)
| Juan Toscano-Anderson (6)
| FedExForum0
| 22–21
|- style="background:#fcc"
| 44
| March 23
| Philadelphia
| 
| Kelly Oubre Jr. (24)
| Kelly Oubre Jr. (10)
| Green, Mannion (6)
| Chase Center0
| 22–22
|- style="background:#fcc"
| 45
| March 25
| @ Sacramento
| 
| Andrew Wiggins (26)
| Andrew Wiggins (10)
| Jordan Poole (5)
| Golden 1 Center0
| 22–23
|- style="background:#fcc"
| 46
| March 26
| Atlanta
| 
| Andrew Wiggins (29)
| Andrew Wiggins (7)
| Draymond Green (9)
| Chase Center0
| 22–24
|- style="background:#cfc"
| 47
| March 29
| Chicago
| 
| Stephen Curry (32)
| Kelly Oubre Jr. (11)
| Draymond Green (9)
| Chase Center0
| 23–24

|- style="background:#fcc"
| 48
| April 1
| @ Miami
| 
| Stephen Curry (36)
| Stephen Curry (11)
| Draymond Green (8)
| American Airlines Arena0
| 23–25
|- style="background:#fcc"
| 49
| April 2
| @ Toronto
| 
| Andrew Wiggins (15)
| Kelly Oubre Jr. (7)
| Nico Mannion (4)
| Amalie Arena3,085
| 23–26
|- style="background:#fcc"
| 50
| April 4
| @ Atlanta
| 
| Stephen Curry (37)
| Kelly Oubre Jr. (11)
| Draymond Green (11)
| State Farm Arena2,937
| 23–27
|- style="background:#cfc"
| 51
| April 6
| Milwaukee
| 
| Stephen Curry (41)
| James Wiseman (10)
| Draymond Green (8)
| Chase Center0
| 24–27
|- style="background:#fcc"
| 52
| April 9
| Washington
| 
| Stephen Curry (32)
| Andrew Wiggins (7)
| Draymond Green (8)
| Chase Center0
| 24–28
|- style="background:#cfc"
| 53
| April 10
| Houston
| 
| Stephen Curry (38)
| Stephen Curry (8)
| Draymond Green (7)
| Chase Center0
| 25–28
|- style="background:#cfc"
| 54
| April 12
| Denver
| 
| Stephen Curry (53)
| Kevon Looney (11)
| Draymond Green (7)
| Chase Center0
| 26–28
|- style="background:#cfc"
| 55
| April 14
| @ Oklahoma City
| 
| Stephen Curry (42)
| Draymond Green (10)
| Draymond Green (16)
| Chesapeake Energy Arena0
| 27–28
|- style="background:#cfc"
| 56
| April 15
| @ Cleveland
| 
| Stephen Curry (33)
| Green, Looney (10)
| Draymond Green (8)
| Rocket Mortgage FieldHouse4,148
| 28–28
|- style="background:#fcc"
| 57
| April 17
| @ Boston
| 
| Stephen Curry (47)
| Kevon Looney (9)
| Draymond Green (10)
| TD Garden2,298
| 28–29
|- style="background:#cfc"
| 58
| April 19
| @ Philadelphia
| 
| Stephen Curry (49)
| Kevon Looney (15)
| Draymond Green (6)
| Wells Fargo Center4,094
| 29–29
|- style="background:#fcc"
| 59
| April 21
| @ Washington
| 
| Kelly Oubre Jr. (24)
| Bazemore, Oubre Jr. (9)
| Curry, Green (8)
| Capital One Arena2,133
| 29–30
|- style="background:#cfc"
| 60
| April 23
| Denver
| 
| Stephen Curry (32)
| Draymond Green (12)
| Draymond Green (19)
| Chase Center1,935
| 30–30
|- style="background:#cfc"
| 61
| April 25
| Sacramento
| 
| Stephen Curry (37)
| Draymond Green (14)
| Draymond Green (13)
| Chase Center3,252
| 31–30
|- style="background:#fcc"
| 62
| April 27
| Dallas
| 
| Stephen Curry (27)
| Draymond Green (11)
| Mannion, Wiggins (5)
| Chase Center3,613
| 31–31
|- style="background:#fcc"
| 63
| April 29
| @ Minnesota
| 
| Stephen Curry (37)
| Kent Bazemore (10)
| Stephen Curry (8)
| Target Center1,638
| 31–32

|- style="background:#cfc"
| 64
| May 1
| @ Houston
| 
| Stephen Curry (30)
| Draymond Green (11)
| Draymond Green (8)
| Toyota Center3,702
| 32–32
|- style="background:#cfc"
| 65
| May 3
| @ New Orleans
| 
| Stephen Curry (41)
| Draymond Green (13)
| Draymond Green (15)
| Smoothie King Center3,700
| 33–32
|- style="background:#fcc"
| 66
| May 4
| @ New Orleans
| 
| Stephen Curry (37)
| Draymond Green (12)
| Draymond Green (9)
| Smoothie King Center3,700
| 33–33
|- style="background:#cfc"
| 67
| May 6
| Oklahoma City
| 
| Stephen Curry (34)
| Kevon Looney (10)
| Draymond Green (9)
| Chase Center3,621
| 34–33
|- style="background:#cfc"
| 68
| May 8
| Oklahoma City
| 
| Stephen Curry (49)
| Kevon Looney (12)
| Draymond Green (13)
| Chase Center4,155
| 35–33
|- style="background:#cfc"
| 69
| May 10
| Utah
| 
| Stephen Curry (36)
| Kevon Looney (13)
| Draymond Green (10)
| Chase Center4,155
| 36–33
|- style="background:#cfc"
| 70
| May 11
| Phoenix
| 
| Andrew Wiggins (38)
| Draymond Green (10)
| Draymond Green (11)
| Chase Center4,155
| 37–33
|- style="background:#cfc"
| 71
| May 14
| New Orleans
| 
| Jordan Poole (38)
| Juan Toscano-Anderson (9)
| Juan Toscano-Anderson (9)
| Chase Center4,155
| 38–33
|- style="background:#cfc"
| 72
| May 16
| Memphis
| 
| Stephen Curry (46)
| Kevon Looney (11)
| Curry, Green (9)
| Chase Center4,416
| 39–33

Play-in

The Warriors finished the regular season with the 8th-best record in the Western Conference, and qualified for the play-in games instituted in the 2020 NBA playoffs. Needing to win only one of possibly two games they could play, they lost to the Lakers who took the 7th seed with the victory, then lost to the Grizzlies in overtime who captured the 8th seed in the conference.

|- style="background:#fcc"
| 1
| May 19
| @ L.A. Lakers
| 
| Stephen Curry (37)
| Kevon Looney (13)
| Draymond Green (8)
| Staples Center6,022
| 0–1
|- style="background:#fcc"
| 2
| May 21
| Memphis
| 
| Stephen Curry (39)
| Draymond Green (16)
| Draymond Green (10)
| Chase Center7,505
| 0–2

Player statistics

Regular season

|
| 67 || 18 || 19.9 || .449 || .408 || .692 || 3.4 || 1.6 || 1.0 || .5 || 7.2
|-
| ≠
| 1 || 0 || 15.0 || .000 || — || .500 || 5.0 || 2.0 || .0 ||2.0|| 1.0
|-
| †
| 2 || 0 || 13.5 || .357 || .200 || .500 || 6.5 || 1.0 || .0 || 1.0 || 6.5
|-
|
| 63 || 63 ||34.2|| .482 || .421 ||.916|| 5.5 || 5.8 || 1.2 || .1 ||32.0
|-
|
| 63 || 63 || 31.5 || .447 || .270 || .795 ||7.1||8.9||1.7|| .8 || 7.0
|-
|
| 57 || 1 || 18.9 || .467 || .397 || .909 || 3.2 || 1.3 || .7 || .1 || 6.5
|-
|
| 61 || 34 || 19.0 || .548 || .235 || .646 || 5.3 || 2.0 || .3 || .4 || 4.1
|-
|
| 30 || 1 || 12.1 || .342 || .367 || .821 || 1.5 || 2.3 || .5 || .0 || 4.1
|-
|
| 60 || 6 || 12.8 || .449 || .397 || .636 || 1.0 || .4 || .2 || .2 || 5.6
|-
|
| 55 || 50 || 30.7 || .439 || .316 || .695 || 6.0 || 1.3 || 1.0 || .8 || 15.4
|-
|
| 40 || 2 || 17.4 || .497 || .333 || .713 || 3.2 || 1.3 || .3 || .2 || 9.5
|-
| ≠
| 10 || 0 || 4.0 ||.769||.500|| .750 || 1.1 || .1 || .6 || .1 || 2.5
|-
|
| 51 || 7 || 19.4 || .432 || .351 || .882 || 1.8 || 1.9 || .5 || .2 || 12.0
|-
|
| 15 || 1 || 5.6 || .407 || .400 || .333 || 1.1 || .3 || .2 || .3 || 1.9
|-
|
| 53 || 16 || 20.9 || .579 || .402 || .710 || 4.4 || 2.8 || .8 || .5 || 5.7
|-
| †
| 39 || 0 || 16.0 || .353 || .213 || .893 || 1.7 || 2.5 || .7 || .2 || 4.7
|-
|
|71||71|| 33.3 || .477 || .380 || .714 || 4.9 || 2.4 || .9 || 1.0 || 18.6
|-
|
| 39 || 27 || 21.4 || .519 || .316 || .628 || 5.8 || .7 || .3 || .9 || 11.5
|}
After all games.
‡ Waived during the season
† Traded during the season
≠ Acquired during the season

Transactions

Trades

Free Agency

Re-signed

Additions

Subtractions

Awards

References

Golden State Warriors seasons
Golden State
Golden State Warriors
Golden State Warriors